Evaporation ponds are artificial ponds with very large surface areas that are designed to efficiently evaporate water by sunlight and expose water to the ambient temperatures. Evaporation ponds are inexpensive to design making it ideal for multiple purposes such as wastewater treatment processes, storage, and extraction of minerals. Evaporation ponds differ in usage and result in a wide range of environmental and health effects.

Uses

Extraction 
Salt evaporation ponds produce salt from seawater. Evaporation ponds are used to extract Lithium from underground brine solution. The extracted Lithium is then used to make ion batteries. Mines use them to separate ore from water. The ore can be sold for use in different industries.  Potash evaporation ponds are used to extract potassium from the mineral rich solution. The potassium extracted is used for products like fertilizer.

Storage 
Evaporation ponds are also used to dispose of brine from desalination plants.  Evaporation ponds at contaminated sites remove the water from hazardous waste, which reduces its weight and volume and allows it to be more easily transported and stored. Evaporation ponds are used to prevent run off agricultural wastewater contaminants like pesticides, fertilizers and salts from entering bodies of water they would normally flow into.

Design and operation 
Location of the evaporation pond should be considered for optimal results. Evaporation ponds are designed to be effective in areas with high amounts of solar radiation ,high temperatures, and low wind levels. Evaporation ponds operate best at shallow depths which require a large amount of land usage.A shallow pond covering greater surface area will result in faster rates of evaporation. Evaporation pond liners that range in quality and cost are used to prevent contamination. Evaporation pond liners are categorized as geomembrane, constructed bentonite clay, or natural clay. Each pond liner is prone to leakage and requires regular maintenance.  The contents of the evaporation pond depend on the use, the evaporation pond will contain water and the desired contents hoping to be extracted. The desired contents range from waste to minerals. The sun will promote evaporation of water from the pond. The remaining contents are either stored or extracted.

Health impacts 
Evaporation ponds, when not maintained, leak contaminated contents into the environment which directly effect human and animal health. The contents within the evaporation pond can be found to contaminate surrounding soil and surrounding water sources. Contaminated water can contain sources of chemicals and hard metals like selenium which in accumulation can be toxic when ingested by humans or animals. Employees working directly with the evaporation ponds may experience acute health conditions like dry skin and irritation from close contact of contents within the pond.

Environmental impacts 
Evaporation ponds pose a threat to environmental sustainability because resources like water, land, and minerals are rapidly used at large scales. These resources are limited in nature. An increasing demand for extracted products and treated wastewater will result in evaporation ponds expanding and related issues worsening until the depletion of these resources. Evaporation ponds are found to increase green house gas emissions and therefore contribute to environmental issues like warming of the planet and ocean acidification. As the pond evaporates, it carries with it volatile pollutants into the air.

Technology 
Advancing technology has made evaporation pond design and implementation more effective. With new resources such as fabric evaporations for salt-tolerant plants, the ponds' costs and environmental impacts can be mediated.

See also
 Seawater greenhouse

References

California Department of Water Resources - Evaporation Ponds
University of Wyoming - Design Information for Evaporation Ponds in Wyoming
USDA - Turning Evaporation Ponds into Arable Land
World Bank - AgWater Sourcebook

Ponds
Resource extraction
Waste treatment technology